"Turkey in the Straw" is an American folk song that first gained popularity in the 19th century.  Early versions of the song were titled "Zip Coon", which were first published around 1834 and performed in minstrel shows, with different people claiming authorship of the song. The melody of "Zip Coon" later became known as "Turkey in the Straw"; a song titled "Turkey in de Straw" with different music and lyrics was published in 1861 together with the wordless music of "Zip Coon" added at the end, and the title "Turkey in the Straw" then became linked to the tune of "Zip Coon".

The song is related to a number of tunes of the 19th century and the origin of these songs has been widely debated. Links to older Irish/Scottish/English ballads have been proposed, such as "The Old Rose Tree".  The song became highly popular and many variations of the song exist. It was also frequently adapted and used in popular media. A song based on the tune of "Turkey in the Straw", "Nigger Love a Watermelon, Ha! Ha! Ha!", has been described as having the "most racist song title".

Origin
"Turkey in the Straw" is thought to be originally a tune from 19th century minstrel shows, "Zip Coon" or "Old Zip Coon", published around 1834. The authorship of the song has been claimed by George Washington Dixon who popularized the song, and Bob Farrell and George Nicholls. "Zip Coon" in turn has been linked to a number of 19th folk songs believed to have older antecedents in Irish/Scottish/English folk songs. Songs proposed it has links to include "Natchez Under the Hill", "The Old Bog Hole", "The Rose Tree", "Sugar in the Gourd", "The Black Eagle", "Glasgow Hornpipe", "Haymaker's Dance", "The Post Office", "Old Mother Oxford", "Kinnegad Slasher" and others.  

Eloise Hubbard Linscott believes that the first part of the song is a contrafactum of the ballad "My Grandmother Lived on Yonder Little Green", published in 1857 by Horace Waters, which is in turn said to be a contrafactum of the Irish/Scottish/English ballad "The Old Rose Tree" published by at least 1795 in Great Britain. The link to "The Old Rose Tree" has been questioned, but a number of musicologists suggest that it may be a composite of "The Rose Tree" and "The (Bonny) Black Eagle". Similar tune was popular with fiddle players as early as 1820, and the tune of "Turkey in the Straw"/"Zip Coon" may have come from the fiddle tune "Natchez Under the Hill" believed to have been derived from "Rose Tree".

The title "Turkey in the Straw" later became associated with the tune of "Zip Coon" in an unusual way. According to James J. Fuld,  Dan Bryant copyright a song with new lyrics and music titled "Turkey in the Straw" on July 12, 1861, but with the wordless music of "Zip Coon" (but titled "Old Melody") attached at the end. The tune of "Zip Coon" then became known as "Turkey in the Straw".

Lyrics

 First verse

 Traditional chorus

 First verse of another version

 First verse of another version

 The full lyrics

 
 Tuckahoe (Peltandra virginica, also called green arrow arum) = an edible wetland plant with long petioles
 Reubens = farmers

There are versions from the American Civil War, versions about fishing and one with nonsense verses. Folklorists have documented folk versions with obscene lyrics from the 19th century.

 Lyrics of The Wiggles and Sharon Lois and Bram

Another version is called "Natchez Under the Hill". The lyrics are thought to have been added by Bob Farrell who first performed them in a blackface act on August 11, 1834.

 First verse of another version

In 1942, a soundie titled, "Turkey in the Straw" was created by Freddie Fisher and The Schnickelfritz Band (directed by Sam Coslow and produced by Josef Berne). There are two versions to the chorus that are sung. The first goes:

 Chorus; first version

 Chorus; second version

In Barney & Friends, they used these lyrics:

Mickey's Fun Songs and Sesame Street use these lyrics:

"Zip Coon" 

The title of "Zip Coon" or "Old Zip Coon" was used to signify a dandified free black man in northern United States. "Zip" was a diminutive of "Scipio", a name commonly used for slaves.  According to Stuart Flexner, "coon" was short for "raccoon" and by 1832 meant a frontier rustic and by 1840 also a Whig. At that time, "coon" was typically used to refer to someone white, it was only in 1848 when a clear use of the word "coon" to refer to a black person in a derogative sense appeared. It is possible that the negative racial connotation of the word may have evolved from "Zip Coon" and the common use of the word "coon" in minstrel shows. An alternative suggestion of the word's origin to mean a black person is that it was derived from barracoon, an enclosure for slaves in transit increasingly used in the years before American Civil War, but on the stage, "coon" could have been used earlier as a black character was named Raccoon in a 1767 colonial comic opera.

"Zip Coon" was sung to the same tune as "Turkey in the Straw", and it was first performed by Bob Farrell, and popularized by George Washington Dixon in the 1830s. This version was first published between 1829 and 1834 in either New York or Baltimore.  Dixon, and Bob Farrell and George Nicholls had separately claimed to have written the song, and the dispute has not been not resolved. Ohio songwriter Daniel Decatur Emmett is sometimes erroneously credited as the song's author.

"Zip Coon" has a vocal range of an octave and a minor sixth. Both the verse and the chorus end on the tonic, and both begin a major third above the tonic. In the verse, the highest note is a fifth above the tonic and the lowest is a minor sixth below. In the chorus, the highest note is an octave above the last note, and the lowest is the last note itself. The song stays in key throughout.

The song gave rise to the blackface minstrel show character Zip Coon.

"Zip Coon" has many different lyrical versions. Thomas Birch published a version in 1834, while George Washington Dixon published a version called "Ole Zip Coon" with different lyrics circa 1835. Both Birch's and Dixon's versions keep the same chorus and the first four stanzas:

 Chorus

 Chorus

 Chorus

In subsequent stanzas, both lyricists talk about events in the life of Andrew Jackson, Birch of President Jackson's battle with the Second Bank of the United States and Dixon of General Jackson at the Battle of New Orleans. When the Mexican–American War began, Dixon published a new version of "Zip Coon" with updated lyrics pertaining to the war:

The chorus "Zip a duden duden duden zip a duden day" likely influenced the song "Zip-A-Dee-Doo-Dah" in Walt Disney's 1946 adaptation of Joel Chandler Harris' Uncle Remus tales, Song of the South.

Another version of "Old Zip Coon" with new self-referencing lyrics by David K. Stevens (1860–1946) was published in the Boy Scout Song Book (1920). Stevens' lyrics contain no direct racial references other than the title of the song itself:

"Nigger Love a Watermelon, Ha! Ha! Ha!"

"Nigger Love a Watermelon, Ha! Ha! Ha!" is a 1916 adaptation of "Turkey in the Straw", performed by Harry C. Browne and produced by Columbia Records. It has since been named as the most racist song title in the United States for its use of watermelon stereotypes.

The song was released in March 1916. It was performed by the silent movie actor Harry C. Browne. It was released with "Old Dan Tucker" as a B-side. The music for it was based upon "Turkey in the Straw" and performed with Browne singing baritone whilst playing a banjo with orchestral accompaniment. A contemporary review in July 1916 called it: "... a treat to tickle the musical palates of those who love to listen to the old-time slave-day river songs". Columbia Records continued to promote it up to 1925. The song used racist stereotypes in it with Browne describing watermelons as "colored man's ice-cream".

Radio DJ Dr. Demento, who had played older songs with racial overtones on the radio, refused to ever play this song because he felt that the title showed it was always intended to be hateful. In 2014, Dr. Theodore R. Johnson asserted that the jingle used by many ice cream trucks in the United States was based upon this song. It has been argued that this allegation is incorrect, as the "Turkey in the Straw" tune had been used long before this song was created. Nevertheless, because of the association, a number of American ice cream truck companies ceased to use the "Turkey in the Straw" melody for their jingles.

Performance history

Artistic and popular use of "Turkey in the Straw" through the years has established the song as an item of Americana. 
 "Turkey in the Straw" was Billy the Kid's favorite song.
 “Turkey in the Straw” was the signature song of Billy Golden, an American blackface comic who was a popular recording artist from the 1890s to the 1910s.
 In 1909, the composer Charles Ives incorporated the tune, along with other vernacular American melodies, into his orchestral Symphony No. 2. 
 According to survivors, "Turkey in the Straw" was among songs played by the band of the RMS Titanic at one point during the sinking on April 14 and 15, 1912.
 "Nigger Love a Watermelon" (1916) was recorded by Harry C. Browne.
 In 1920, American composer Leo Wood wrote the lyrics to Otto Bonnell's version of "Turkey In The Straw, A Rag-Time Fantasy" which was published by Leo Feist Inc., New York.
 In early June 1922 Texas champion breakdown fiddler Eck Robertson, together with Henry C. Guililand, made America's first commercial recordings of fiddle music for the Victor Talking Machine Company in New York City, featuring "Turkey In The Straw" as one of their four song selections.
 In 1925, American composer Joseph W. Clokey (stepfather of Gumby creator Art Clokey) wrote the choral ballad "The Musical Trust", which incorporated "Turkey in the Straw" (with a reference to ''Zip Coon'') and other traditional American tunes.
 In 1926, "Turkey in the Straw" was recorded by the old-time band Gid Tanner & His Skillet Lickers with Riley Puckett.
 In 1928, this was used as the base melody in the famous early Mickey Mouse cartoon Steamboat Willie. The rendering of the tune in the cartoon is noted for being one of the first instances of successful synchronization in animated films. The tune became prominent in Disney's animated series and was used in many subsequent cartoons in the 1920s and 1930s, including the first Mickey Mouse cartoon in color, The Band Concert, in which Donald Duck annoys an orchestra by repeatedly playing the tune over their efforts at The William Tell Overture.
 In 1942, Carson Robison performed an anti-Axis Powers version of "Turkey in the Straw".
 The full melody is quoted in a fiddle and whistling solo in the "Skip To My Lou" number from the 1944 musical film Meet Me in St. Louis starring Judy Garland.
 Erno Dohnanyi used the tune (and also two other traditional American folk tunes) in his composition American Rhapsody (1953).
 The melody is played by many ice cream trucks; in Raymond Chandler's 1942 novel The High Window, the protagonist recounts "The Good Humor man went by in his little blue and white wagon, playing 'Turkey in the Straw' on his music box".
 The instrumental "Hoedown" from Emerson Lake and Palmer's album Trilogy quotes the melody.
 The 1990 film Back to the Future Part III featured this song, which was arranged by Alan Silvestri and ZZ Top.
 The 1990s animated television series Animaniacs used the tune for "Wakko's America", in which Wakko names all 50-state capitals in the form of a song.
 Adult Swim's television series Robot Chicken used the song as a part of their Robot Chicken: Star Wars Episode III special, in which Emperor Palpatine lists the lesser known Star Wars orders, 1–65.
 The Morning Musume song "Ningen Kankei No Way Way" uses the melody of tune (also known as the "Oklahoma Mixer" in Japan) during the dance break.
 Barney & Friends had a rewritten version of this song which was sung in the direct-to-video films such as "Barney's Adventure Bus" and "Let's Go to the Farm, as well as the Season 5 episode "Howdy Friends!" and the Season 8 episode "Squares, Squares, Everywhere!".

See also
Coon song
"Do Your Ears Hang Low?"
"Unsquare Dance"

References

Further reading
 Fuld, James (1966). The Book of World Famous Music, Classical, Popular and Folk''.

External links
 Turkey in the Straw
 Old Zip Coon
 
 NPR: Recall That Ice Cream Truck Song? We Have Unpleasant News For You
 The New Republic: That Viral Story About the Racist Ice Cream Song Is Wrong

American folk songs
American country music songs
Blackface minstrel songs
American children's songs
Traditional children's songs
19th-century songs
1923 singles
1926 singles
Songs of the American Civil War
Year of song unknown
Thanksgiving songs